Linda Reimer (born 1959 or 1960) is a Canadian politician, who was elected to the Legislative Assembly of British Columbia in the 2013 provincial election. She represented the electoral district of Port Moody-Coquitlam as a member of the British Columbia Liberal Party.

Prior to her election to the legislature, Reimer was a member of Coquitlam City Council. She also served as a Councillor on the Council of the BC College of Teachers, the regulatory authority for the teaching profession, and was one of the 11 of 20 councillors that called for the College's independence from the influence of the BC Teachers' Federation, the teachers' union who practised a policy of open and active intervention and interference into legislated functions of that body.

Electoral record

References

British Columbia Liberal Party MLAs
Women MLAs in British Columbia
Coquitlam city councillors
Living people
Women municipal councillors in Canada
21st-century Canadian politicians
Year of birth uncertain
21st-century Canadian women politicians
Year of birth missing (living people)